Venkata III (born Pedda Venkata Raya) was the grandson of Aliya Rama Raya. Venkata III belonged to a Telugu family and became the King of the Vijayanagara Empire from 1632–1642.
His brothers-in-law were Damarla Venkatappa Nayaka and Damarla Ayyappa Nayaka, both sons of Damarla Chennapa Nayakadu.

Seizure by Timma Raja
His paternal uncle, Timma Raja, another brother of Sriranga II, considering himself to have a better claim, seized the government at Vellore Fort, compelling Venkata III to remain in his native Anekonda. The Nayaks of Gingee, Tanjore and Madurai declared support for Venkata III, while Timma Raja got support from no-one and was looked upon as a usurper.

Timma Raja nevertheless made a lot of trouble and civil strife continued until his death in 1635. Initially he was winning, until the King Pedda Venkata (Venkata III)'s nephew, Sriranga III took to the field and defeated Timma Raja with help from the Dutch in Pulicat, compelling him to accept Venkata III's claim. Timma Raja was allowed some territories under his control, but stirred up trouble for a second time, only to be slain by the Nayak of Gingee in 1635.

Peace was finally restored and Pedda Venkata Raya or Venkata III returned to Vellore to take charge.

Madras Land Grant
On 22 August 1639, Francis Day of the East India Company obtained a small strip of Land in the Coromandel Coast from  Pedda Venkata Raya in Chandragiri as a place to build a factory and warehouse for their trading activities. The region was under the control of the Damerla Venkatadri Nayakudu, a Recherla Velama Nayak of Kalahasti and Vandavasi. Venkatadri Nayakudu was son of Damerla Chennappa Nayakudu. This is widely regarded at the founding event of the formation of the Chennai (Madras) Metropolis and is to the day celebrated as Madras Day.

Trouble from Southern Nayaks
In 1637 the Nayaks of Tanjore and Madurai, out of some complications attempted to seize Venkata III and attacked Vellore but were defeated and peace was established.

Sriranga III's rebellion
The King's loyal nephew, Sriranga III, for some reason turned against the King in 1638 and engineered an invasion from Bijapur. The Bijapur – Sriranga III combine initially attacked Bangalore making the King Venkata III buy peace after an expensive deal. In 1641, the same combine launched another attack and were just  from Vellore Fort, but their camp was attacked with backing by Southern Nayaks.

Golkonda forces
In the following year (1641), the Qutb Shahi dynasty of Golconda watching the disorder, sent a huge force along the East Coast. The Golkonda army, after facing a stiff resistance near Madras by Venkata III's army backed by Damerla Venkatadri Nayak of Kalahasti and the Gingee Nayak, marched towards the Vellore Fort. But Venkata III, now badly under threat from all sides retreated to the Jungles of Chittoor and died October 1642.

Venkata III had no son and was immediately succeeded by his treacherous nephew Sriranga III, who came to Vellore Fort after deserting the Bijapur camp.

References

 Rao, Velcheru Narayana, and David Shulman, Sanjay Subrahmanyam. Symbols of substance : court and state in Nayaka period Tamilnadu (Delhi ; Oxford : Oxford University Press, 1998) ; xix, 349 p., [16] p. of plates : ill., maps ; 22 cm. ; Oxford India paperbacks ; Includes bibliographical references and index ; .
 Sathianathaier, R. History of the Nayaks of Madura [microform] by R. Sathyanatha Aiyar ; edited for the University, with introduction and notes by S. Krishnaswami Aiyangar ([Madras] : Oxford University Press, 1924) ; see also ([London] : H. Milford, Oxford university press, 1924) ; xvi, 403 p. ; 21 cm. ; SAMP early 20th-century Indian books project item 10819.
 K.A. Nilakanta Sastry, History of South India, From Prehistoric times to fall of Vijayanagar, 1955, OUP, (Reprinted 2002) .

1642 deaths
People of the Vijayanagara Empire
People from Vellore district
Indian Hindus
Telugu monarchs
Year of birth unknown
17th-century Indian monarchs